Maurice De Shawn Taylor (born October 30, 1976) is an American former professional basketball player. He played power forward and center positions. Originally from Detroit, Taylor played college basketball at Michigan and was selected by the Los Angeles Clippers as the 14th overall pick in the 1997 NBA draft. Taylor played from 1997 to 2007 in the NBA for the Clippers, Houston Rockets, New York Knicks, and Sacramento Kings. From 2009 to 2011, Taylor played internationally in Italy and China.

College career
Taylor attended the University of Michigan. The athletic forward, from Henry Ford High School in Detroit, burst onto the national scene during the 1994 Maui Invitational with fellow freshman Maceo Baston. He won Big Ten Freshman of the Year for the 1994–1995 season, averaging 12.4 points and 5.1 rebounds and playing in the NCAA Tournament. As a sophomore, he averaged 14 points and 7 rebounds and was picked 2nd Team All-Big Ten. Off the court that year, Taylor was involved in a traffic accident while out with potential recruit Mateen Cleaves that left teammate Robert Traylor with a broken arm and that led to the University of Michigan basketball scandal. After considering entering the NBA draft, Taylor returned to help lead a talented (if underachieving) Michigan team to the 1997 NIT Championship while averaging 12.3 points and 6.2 rebounds.

Professional career

NBA

In 1997, he was drafted 14th overall by the Los Angeles Clippers. In 2000, Taylor told the Clippers he would not re-sign with them in free agency or accept any sign-and-trade situations. When he became a free agent, Taylor announced his intention of hoping to sign with the Orlando Magic to join newly acquired players Grant Hill and Tracy McGrady.  No contract offer from Orlando ever came. He then signed with the Houston Rockets instead.  He was then traded to the New York Knicks in 2005, before joining the Sacramento Kings in 2006. He was released on January 23, 2007.

Europe

In January 2009, he joined the Italian Euroleague club Olimpia Milano.  He had not played since January 2007. In February 2011 he signed with Enel Brindisi until the end of the season, but reached a consensual termination of the contract with the club in April 2011.

Booster scandal

Years after the completion of his college career, Taylor, along with several other Michigan stars, was accused of taking money from booster Ed Martin.  Due to concerns that Taylor's amateur status had been compromised, Michigan forfeited every game in which Taylor played, and scrubbed his records from its record books.  The school was also forced to disassociate itself from Taylor until 2012.

However, he was in the stands in New York with another former Wolverine, Jalen Rose, to support the team during the 2006 NIT Final Four.

Personal
Through his mother, Taylor is of Italian descent.

Notes

External links

Euroleague.net Player Profile
Player Profile @ Basketpedya.com

1976 births
Living people
African-American basketball players
American expatriate basketball people in China
American expatriate basketball people in Italy
American people of Italian descent
Basketball players from Detroit
Centers (basketball)
Houston Rockets players
Los Angeles Clippers draft picks
Los Angeles Clippers players
Michigan Wolverines men's basketball players
New Basket Brindisi players
New York Knicks players
Olimpia Milano players
Pallacanestro Treviso players
Parade High School All-Americans (boys' basketball)
Power forwards (basketball)
Sacramento Kings players
Shanxi Loongs players
Henry Ford High School (Detroit, Michigan) alumni
American men's basketball players
Doping cases in basketball
21st-century African-American sportspeople
20th-century African-American sportspeople